The Ouseley Baronetcy, of Claremont in the County of Hertford, was a title in the Baronetage of the United Kingdom. It was created on 3 October 1808 for the entrepreneur, linguist and diplomat, Gore Ouseley. He was succeeded by his son, the second Baronet. He was a composer, organist, and musicologist. The title became extinct on his death in 1889.

The first Baronet was the brother of Sir William Ouseley and the uncle of Sir William Gore Ouseley.

Ouseley baronets, of Claremont (1808)

Sir Gore Ouseley, 1st Baronet (1770–1844)
Sir Frederick Arthur Gore Ouseley, 2nd Baronet (1825–1889). He died unmarried.

References

Extinct baronetcies in the Baronetage of the United Kingdom